John Congemi is a former Canadian Football League quarterback and current college football analyst for ESPN.

Congemi played quarterback for the University of Pittsburgh Panthers football team during 1982–1986. He finished second all time in passing yards and led his team to the 1984 Fiesta Bowl. He won the game's MVP award, despite losing the game 28–23.

After college Congemi played in the CFL for the Toronto Argonauts, Ottawa Rough Riders, Saskatchewan Roughriders. In 1993, he also played part of the 1993 season with the Miami Hooters of the Arena Football League. After the stint, he returned to the CFL to play for the Baltimore Stallions in 1994.

After retiring, Congemi returned to his native Florida, where he worked as a football analyst for SportsChannel Florida and WQAM. Congemi served as a color commentator for the Big East Network from 2000 to 2011. He has been calling ESPNU games since the network began in 2005.

References

1964 births
Living people
American football quarterbacks
Baltimore Stallions players
Canadian football quarterbacks
College football announcers
Miami Hooters players
Ottawa Rough Riders players
Pittsburgh Panthers football players
Players of American football from Pennsylvania
Saskatchewan Roughriders players
Congemi, John
Toronto Argonauts players
Players of American football from Youngstown, Ohio